This is a list of awards and nominations received by English big beat musician Fatboy Slim. He has notably received 2 Brit Awards and 1 Grammy Award.

Awards and nominations

ASCAP Pop Music Awards

!Ref.
|-
| 2000
| "Praise You"
| Most Performed Song
| 
|

BT Digital Music Awards

!Ref.
|-
| 2004
| Fatboy Slim
| Best Dance Artist
| 
|

Brit Awards

|-
| rowspan="3" | 1999
| rowspan="2" | Fatboy Slim
| British Male Solo Artist
| 
|-
| British Dance Act
| 
|-
| "The Rockafeller Skank"
| rowspan="2" | British Single of the Year
| 
|-
| rowspan="3" | 2000
| rowspan="2" | "Praise You"
| 
|-
| British Video of the Year
| 
|-
| rowspan="4" | Fatboy Slim
| rowspan="2" | British Dance Act
| 
|-
| rowspan="2" | 2001
| 
|-
| British Male Solo Artist
| 
|-
| rowspan="2" | 2002
| British Dance Act
| 
|-
| "Weapon of Choice" (featuring Bootsy Collins)
| British Video of the Year
| 
|}

DanceStar Awards

|-
| rowspan=5|2001
| rowspan=3|Himself
| Best Breakbeat/Eclectic Act
| 
|-
| DanceStar of the Year 
| 
|-
| Best Club DJ
| 
|-
| Halfway Between the Gutter and the Stars
| Album of the Year 
| 
|-
| "Weapon of Choice"
| Video of the Year 
|

Denmark GAFFA Awards
Delivered since 1991, the GAFFA Awards are a Danish award that rewards popular music by the magazine of the same name.

!
|-
| 1998
| Himself
| Foreign New Act
| 
| style="text-align:center;" |
|-
|}

Grammy Award

|-
| rowspan="2" | 2000
| "Praise You"
| Best Dance Recording
| 
|-
| You've Come a Long Way, Baby
| rowspan="2" | Best Alternative Music Album
| 
|-
| rowspan="2 | 2002
| Halfway Between the Gutter and the Stars
| 
|-
| "Weapon of Choice" (featuring Bootsy Collins)
| Best Music Video
| 
|-
| rowspan="2" | 2006
| Palookaville
| Best Dance/Electronic Album
| 
|-
| "Wonderful Night" (featuring Lateef the Truthspeaker)
| Best Dance Recording
|

Hungarian Music Awards

|-
| 2000
| You've Come a Long Way, Baby
| rowspan=2|Best Foreign Dance Album
| 
|-
| 2005
| Palookaville
|

MVPA Awards

|-
| 2000
| "Right Here, Right Now"
| rowspan=2|International Video of the Year 
| 
|-
| 2002
| "Ya Mama"
| 
|-
| rowspan="4" | 2005
| "Don't Let the Man Get You Down"
| rowspan="2" | Best Electronic Video
| 
|-
| "That Old Pair of Jeans" (featuring Lateef the Truthspeaker)
| 
|-
| "Wonderful Night" (featuring Lateef the Truthspeaker)
| Best Directional Debut
| 
|-
| "The Joker" (featuring Bootsy Collins)
| Best Pop Video
| 
|}

NME Awards

|-
| rowspan="4" | 1999
| rowspan=2|"The Rockafeller Skank"
| Best Single
| 
|-
| rowspan=2|Best Dance Recording
| 
|-
| "Gangster Tripping"
| 
|-
| rowspan="4" | Fatboy Slim
| rowspan="2" | Best Dance Act
| 
|-
| rowspan=2|2000
| 
|-
| Best Solo Artist
| 
|-
| 2001
| Best Dance Act
| 
|-
| 2002
| "Weapon of Choice" (featuring Bootsy Collins)
| Best Video
| 
|}

Q Awards

|-
| 2001
| "Weapon of Choice" (featuring Bootsy Collins)
| Best Video
| 
|-
| 2011
| Fatboy Slim
| Inspiration Award
| 
|}

Teen Choice Awards

|-
| 2001
| "Weapon of Choice" (featuring Bootsy Collins)
| Choice Dance Track
| 
|}

MTV Europe Music Award

|-
| 1998
| rowspan="2" | Fatboy Slim
| rowspan="2" | Best Electronic
| 
|-
| rowspan="2" | 1999
| 
|-
| "Praise You"
| rowspan="2" | Best Video
| 
|-
| 2001
| "Weapon of Choice" (featuring Bootsy Collins)
| 
|}

MTV Video Music Award

|-
| rowspan="4" | 1999 || rowspan="4" | "Praise You"  || Best Dance Video || 
|-
| Breakthrough Video || 
|-
| Best Direction || 
|-
| Best Choreography || 
|-
| rowspan="9" | 2001 || rowspan="9" | "Weapon of Choice" (featuring Bootsy Collins)  || Video of the Year || 
|-
| Best Dance Video || 
|-
| Breakthrough Video || 
|-
| Best Direction || 
|-
| Best Choreography || 
|-
| Best Visual Effects || 
|-
| Best Art Direction || 
|-
| Best Editing || 
|-
| Best Cinematography || 
|}

MTV Video Music Awards Japan

|-
| rowspan="2" | 2002
| rowspan="2" | Himself
| Best Male
| 
|-
| Best Dance 
|

World Music Awards

|-
| 2006
| Himself
| World's Best DJ
| 
|-
| 2014
| "Eat, Sleep, Rave, Repeat"
| World's Best Song 
|

Žebřík Music Awards

!Ref.
|-
| rowspan=4|1998
| rowspan=2|Himself
| Best International Instrumentalist
| 
| rowspan=11|
|-
| Best International Surprise
| 
|-
| rowspan=2|"The Rockafeller Skank"
| Best International Song
| 
|-
| Best International Video
| 
|-
| 1999
| rowspan=3|Himself
| rowspan=3|Best International DJ
| 
|-
| 2000
| 
|-
| rowspan=3|2001
| 
|-
| rowspan=2|"Weapon of Choice"
| Best International Song
| 
|-
| Best International Video
| 
|-
| 2002
| rowspan=6|Himself
| rowspan=6|Best International DJ
| 
|-
| 2003
| 
|-
| 2004
| 
| rowspan=4|
|-
| 2005
| 
|-
| 2006
| 
|-
| 2007
|

DJ magazine Top 100 DJs

Other
 Ivor Novello Award for Outstanding Contribution to British Music (2007)
 Silver Clef Award for Icon Award (2012)

Cook was a judge for the 6th annual Independent Music Awards to support independent artists' careers.

In February 2015, Cook was given the University of Brighton's Alumnus Award for his contribution to the music industry and his support for the institution where he studied in the 1980s.

References

External links
 Fatboyslim.net

Fatboy Slim